Serena Williams defeated Lucie Šafářová in the final, 6–3, 6–7(2–7), 6–2 to win the women's singles tennis title at the 2015 French Open. It was her third French Open title, her 20th major singles title overall, and she completed the triple career Grand Slam with the win. Williams would later describe the victory as the proudest achievement of her career; she suffered from influenza during her title run.

Maria Sharapova was the defending champion, but lost in the fourth round to Šafářová.

2008 champion Ana Ivanovic reached her first major semifinal since winning the title seven years previously; it was also her last major semifinal.

Seeds

Qualifying

Draw

Finals

Top half

Section 1

Section 2

Section 3

Section 4

Bottom half

Section 5

Section 6

Section 7

Section 8

Championship match statistics

References

External links
 Main draw
2015 French Open – Women's draws and results at the International Tennis Federation

Women's Singles
French Open by year – Women's singles
French Open - Women's Singles
2015 in women's tennis
2015 in French women's sport